The Painter is a 1976 album by Paul Anka produced by Denny Diante and arranged by Michel Colombier, and featuring Anka's "West Coast" sound. The LP cover was notable for being a portrait of Anka by Andy Warhol, and was United Artists first release to employ the new Sansui Electric QS Regular Matrix system for Quadraphonic sound and 4-channel pressing technology. The album reached 85 on the US charts.

Singles included "Happier", written by Anka, which reached No. 60 on the US charts.

Track listing
All tracks written by Paul Anka, except where indicated.

References

Paul Anka albums
1976 albums
Albums with cover art by Andy Warhol